Jaakko Vuorinen (25 July 1923 – 19 February 1982) was a Finnish fencer. He competed in the team épée event at the 1952 Summer Olympics.

References

1923 births
1982 deaths
Finnish male épée fencers
Olympic fencers of Finland
Fencers at the 1952 Summer Olympics
Sportspeople from Helsinki